A raised coral atoll or uplifted coral atoll is an atoll that has been lifted high enough above sea level by tectonic forces to protect it from scouring by storms and enable soils and diverse – often endemic – species of flora and fauna to develop. With the exception of Aldabra Island in the Indian Ocean and Henderson Island in the Pacific Ocean, most tropical raised atolls have been dramatically altered by human activities such as species introduction, phosphate mining, and even bomb testing.

References

Atolls
Coastal and oceanic landforms
Coral islands